This is a list of mayors of Caen since 1925.

List of mayors

See also
 Timeline of Caen

Caen